The 2011 Newark and Sherwood District Council election took place on 5 May 2011 to elect members of Sherwood & Newark District Council in Nottinghamshire, England. The whole council was up for election. At the time of the 2011 Census the Local Authority had a population of, 114,817.

Overall election results

Sherwood and Newark District Council (summary of overall results)

Newark and Sherwood District Council - results by ward

Balderton North

Balderton West

Beacon

Blidworth

Boughton

Bridge

Castle

Caunton

Clipstone

Collingham and Meering

Devon

Edwinstowe

Farndon

Farnsfield and Bilsthorpe

Lowdham

Magnus

Muskham

Ollerton

Rainworth

Southwell East

Southwell North

Southwell West

Sutton-on-Trent

Trent

Winthorpe

By-elections between May 2011 - May 2015
By-elections are called when a representative councillor resigns or dies, so are unpredictable.  A by-election is held to fill a political office that has become vacant between the scheduled elections.

Lowdham - 12 April 2012

Collingham and Meering -  2 May 2013

Farnsfield and Bilsthorpe -  27 June 2013

Collingham and Meering -  11 September 2014

Ollerton -  11 September 2014

References

2011 English local elections
2011
2010s in Nottinghamshire